United Nations Security Council resolution 891, adopted unanimously on 20 December 1993, after reaffirming resolutions 812 (1993), 846 (1993) and 872 (1993) on the situation in Rwanda, the Council noted that the presence of the United Nations Observer Mission Uganda–Rwanda (UNOMUR) had contributed to the stability of the area and extended its mandate for an additional six months.

The Council noted that the integration of UNOMUR and the United Nations Assistance Mission for Rwanda (UNAMIR) is solely administrative in that no way would it affect the mandate UNOMUR. The co-operation of the Government of Uganda was welcomed, and all civilian and military authorities in the mandate area were urged to co-operate with the mission.

See also
 Arusha Accords
 History of Rwanda
 List of United Nations Security Council Resolutions 801 to 900 (1993–1994)
 Rwandan Civil War

References

External links
 
Text of the Resolution at undocs.org

 0891
1993 in Rwanda
1993 in Uganda
Rwandan genocide
 0891
 0891
December 1993 events